Pusia tricolor is a species of sea snail, a marine gastropod mollusk, in the family Costellariidae, the ribbed miters.

Distribution
This species occurs in the Mediterranean Sea off France.

References

 Costa, O.G. (1844) Catalogo de'testacei viventi del piccolo e grande mare di Taranto redatto sul sistema di Lamarck. Atti Reale Accademia di Scienze in Napoli, 5, 13–66, 4 pls

External links
 Gmelin J.F. (1791). Vermes. In: Gmelin J.F. (Ed.) Caroli a Linnaei Systema Naturae per Regna Tria Naturae, Ed. 13. Tome 1(6). G.E. Beer, Lipsiae
 Locard, A. (1890). Notices conchyliologiques. X. Les Mitres des côtes de France. i>L'Echange 6(62): 109-110
 Risso, A. (1826-1827). Histoire naturelle des principales productions de l'Europe Méridionale et particulièrement de celles des environs de Nice et des Alpes Maritimes. Paris, F.G. Levrault. 3(XVI): 1-480, 14 pls.
 Bivona-Bernardi Ant. (1832). Caratteri di alcune nuove specie di conchiglie. Effemeride Scientifiche e Letterarie per la Sicilia. 2: 16-24, pls 2-3.

tricolor
Gastropods described in 1791